Adlabad (also Romanized as ‘Adlābād and ‘Ādelābād) is a village in Qalayi Rural District, Firuzabad District, Selseleh County, Lorestan Province, Iran. At the 2006 census, its population was 639, in 138 families.

References 

Towns and villages in Selseleh County